Fahmida Khatun is a Bangladeshi economist who focuses on policy analysis and project management.

Biography
She has completed a master's degree in economics from Jahangirnagar University, Bangladesh. She did another master's degree in environmental and natural resource economics and PhD in economics from the University College London, UK. She has done post doctoral research at the Earth Institute of Columbia University. As part of her PhD, she undertook research on "Estimating Economic Cost of Environmental Degradation and Natural Resource Depreciation in Bangladesh" under the supervision of economist David Pearce. During her post-doctoral research at Columbia University, she worked with Jeffery Sachs on ICT and SDGs, where she specifically looked into financial inclusion through ICT.

She is the current executive director at the Centre for Policy Dialogue. Prior to joining CPD Khatun was a research fellow at the Bangladesh Institute of Development Studies and held positions at the United Nations Development Programme and USAID. She was a faculty member at universities in Bangladesh and England.

Awards
 Anannya Top Ten Awards (2009)

Hobby
Khatun is a passionate Rabindra Sangeet singer and sings mostly for herself. In 2007, Khatun released an album titled Jokhon Prothom Dhoreche Koli, comprising Rabindra Sangeet songs.

Works

Books
 
 
 
 
  [Forthcoming 2020]

Chapters
 Khatun, F (2006). "Duty Free Quota Free Market Access for South Asian LDCs", in: Chimni, B.S., B.L. Das., S Kelegama and M Rahman (eds). South Asia Yearbook of Trade and Development 2006, Centre for Trade and Development (CENTAD), Oxfam GB, India, published by Wiley-India. 
 Khatun, F (2007). "Bangladesh in the WTO, chapter in South Asia in the WTO", in: S Kelegama (ed) 'South Asia in the WTO', published by Sage Publications India, 2007. 
 Khatun, F (2009). "Migrant labour and remittances in Bangladesh", in: Stoler, A. L., J. Redden and L. A. Jackson. Trade and Poverty Reduction in the Asia-pacific Region: Case Studies and Lessons from Low-income Communities. Cambridge: Cambridge University Press, 2009. pp 513–539. 
 Khatun, F. (2012). "A Regional Outlook for Climate Finance in South Asia." In Bhattacharya, D. and Rahman, M. (eds.) Global Recovery, New Risks and Sustainable Growth: Repositioning South Asia. Dhaka: Centre for Policy Dialogue. 
 Khatun, F. (2012). "WTO negotiations on environmental goods and services: South Asia's interests". In Kelegama, S., Adhikari, R., Sharma, P. and Kharel, P. (eds.) Regional Economic Integration: Challenges for South Asia during Turbulent Times. Kathmandu: South Asia Watch on Trade, Economics and Environment (SAWTEE) and South Asia Centre for Policy Studies (SACEPS), pp  253–268. 
 Khatun, F. and Hossain, S. (2014). "India's Economic Rise: Implications for Bangladesh." In Joseph, M. and Jacob, H. (Eds.) India's Economic Growth: Opportunities and Challenges for the Region [Australia India Institute Foreign Policy Series 5]. New Delhi: Australia India Institute (University of Melbourne), Regional Centre for Strategic Studies (Colombo) and Manohar Publishers. 
 Khatun, F. and Ahamad, M. (2014). "ODA to and External Debt in LDCs: Recent Trends." In Istanbul Programme of Action for the LDCs (2011–2020): Monitoring Deliverables, Tracking Progress – Analytical Perspective. London: Commonwealth Secretariat. 
 Khatun, F. (2016). "Development Policies since Independence", in Routledge Handbook of Contemporary Bangladesh, published by Routledge | Taylor & Francis Group. 
 Khatun, F. and Amin, M. A. (2016). "Carbon Emission, Energy Consumption, Deforestation and Agricultural Income in LDCs: Lessons for Post-2015 Development Agenda." In Southern Perspectives on the Post-2015 International Development Agenda. London and New York: Routledge. 
 Khatun F, Shahida Pervin and Md Masudur Rahman (2018). "Bangladesh's pursuit of the 2030 Agenda: will it facilitate smooth graduation?"  In Bangladesh's Graduation from the Least Developed Countries Group: Pitfalls and Promises. London: Routledge.

References

External links
 
 
 
 
 
 
 
 

Living people
Place of birth missing (living people)
Bangladeshi economists
Alumni of University College London
Year of birth missing (living people)